Lake Tõhela is a  lake in southwestern Estonia. Administratively it belongs to the Männikuste village in Tõstamaa Parish, Pärnu County.

See also
List of lakes of Estonia
Lake Ermistu, another lake nearby

References

Lakes of Estonia
Tõstamaa Parish
Landforms of Pärnu County